GNU Chess is a free software chess engine and command-line interface chessboard. The goal of GNU Chess is to serve as a basis for research, and as such it has been used in numerous contexts.

GNU Chess is free software, licensed under the terms of the GNU General Public License version 3 or any later version, and is maintained by collaborating developers. As one of the earliest computer chess programs with full source code available, it is one of the oldest for Unix-based systems and has since been ported to many other platforms.

Features 
GNU Chess 6.2.5 is rated at 2661 Elo points on CCRL's 40-moves-in-2-minutes list. For comparison, the strongest human player, Magnus Carlsen, has achieved an Elo rating of 2882. On the same list, Fritz 8 was rated at 2665 Elo, and that program in the 2004 Man vs Machine World Team Championship beat grandmasters Sergey Karjakin, Veselin Topalov and reached a draw with Ruslan Ponomariov.

It is often used in conjunction with a GUI program such as XBoard or GNOME Chess, where it is included as the default engine. Initial versions of XBoard's Chess Engine Communication Protocol were based on GNU Chess's command-line interface. Version 6 also supports the Universal Chess Interface (UCI). Since version 6.1 GNU chess supports a graphical mode for terminal emulators.

History 
The first version of GNU Chess was written by Stuart Cracraft. Having started in 1984 in collaboration with Richard Stallman prior to his founding of the GNU Project, GNU Chess became one of the first parts of GNU.

GNU Chess has been enhanced and expanded since. Versions from 2 to 4 were written by John Stanback. Version 5 of GNU Chess was based on the Cobalt chess engine written by Chua Kong-Sian.

In 2011, GNU Chess transitioned to version 6, which is based on Fabien Letouzey's Fruit 2.1 chess engine.  According to CEGT version 5.60 of this code base is stronger than Fruit 2.3, the latest version of that chess engine.

See also 

 List of open-source video games
GNOME Chess
GNU Go
XBoard

Notes

References

External links
 

1984 software
Chess engines
DOS games
Free chess software
Free educational software
Chess
GP2X games
Linux games
Unix games
Video games developed in the United States
Windows games